Parancistrocerus perennis is a species of stinging wasp in the family Vespidae.

Subspecies
These two subspecies belong to the species Parancistrocerus perennis:
 Parancistrocerus perennis anacardivora (Rohwer, 1915)
 Parancistrocerus perennis perennis

References

External links

 

Potter wasps
Insects described in 1857